Below is a list of chief commissioners of Ajmer-Merwara Province:

Chief commissioners of Ajmer-Merwara
1871-1873: Richard Harte Keatinge
1873-1878: Sir Lewis Pelly
1878-1887: Edward Ridley Colborne Bradford
1887-1890: Charles Kenneth Mackenzie Walter
1890-1895: George Herbert Trevor
1895-1898: Robert Joseph Crosthwaite
1898-1905: Arthur Henry Temple Martindale
1905-1918: Elliot Graham Colvin
1918-1919: John Manners Smith
1919-1925: Robert Erskine Holland
1925-1927: Stewart Blakeley Agnew Patterson
1927-1932: Leonard William Reynolds
1932-1937: George Drummond Ogilvie
1937-1942: Arthur Cunningham Lothian
1942-1944: George Von berleygilan
1944-1947: Hiranand Rupchand Shivdasani

Chief
 List of Chief Commissioners
British India-related lists